Stillingia uleana is a species of flowering plant in the family Euphorbiaceae. It was described in 1912. It is native to Brazil, in Bahia and Minas Gerais.

References

uleana
Plants described in 1912
Flora of Brazil